Breaksea Island Lighthouse  is an active lighthouse located at Breaksea Island in King George Sound  from Albany.

The first lighthouse was built in 1858 by English convicts using pre-made cast iron sheeting rising it at the centre of an octagonal stone keeper's cottage; in 1889 two keeper's cottages were built.
This lighthouse was replaced in 1901 by a cylindrical granite tower built on the rear still active and in good condition.

A major refurbishment taking 21 weeks was undertaken in early 2020, under a contract from the Australian Maritime Safety Authority (AMSA).

See also
 List of lighthouses in Australia

References

Lighthouses in Western Australia
South West (Western Australia)
State Register of Heritage Places in the City of Albany